Alternative Airplay (formerly known as Modern Rock Tracks (1988–2009) and Alternative Songs (2009–2020)) is a music chart in the United States that has appeared in Billboard magazine since September 10, 1988. It ranks the 40 most-played songs on alternative and modern rock radio stations. Introduced as Modern Rock Tracks, the chart served as a companion to the Mainstream Rock chart (then called Album Rock Tracks), and its creation was prompted by the explosion of alternative music on American radio in the late 1980s. During the first several years of the chart, it regularly featured music that did not receive commercial radio airplay anywhere but on a few modern rock and college rock radio stations. This included many electronic and post-punk artists. Gradually, as alternative rock became more mainstream (spearheaded by the grunge explosion in the early 1990s), alternative and mainstream rock radio stations began playing many of the same songs. By the late 2000s, the genres became more fully differentiated with only limited crossover. The Alternative Airplay chart features more alternative rock, indie pop, and pop punk artists while the Mainstream Rock chart leans towards more guitar-tinged blues rock, hard rock, and heavy metal.

The chart is based solely on radio airplay ranked by a calculation of the total number of spins each song receives per week. As of 2012, approximately 80 alternative radio stations across the United States are electronically monitored 24 hours a day, seven days a week by Nielsen Broadcast Data Systems. The chart had 30 positions when it was introduced in September 1988 and expanded to 40 positions on September 10, 1994.

The chart was renamed to Alternative Songs beginning with the June 20, 2009, issue after Billboard fully absorbed Radio & Records, whose similar chart was called "Alternative" and to reflect the music industry's more common use of the term. In June 2020, Billboard introduced the separate Hot Alternative Songs chart, which uses similar methodology as the Billboard Hot 100 by measuring the popularity of songs classified as alternative across all radio formats, streaming services, and sales within the United States. To avoid confusion, Alternative Songs was renamed Alternative Airplay.

History 
The first alternative chart, called Modern Rock Tracks, appeared in the September 10, 1988, edition of Billboard magazine. The first number-one song of the chart was Siouxsie and the Banshees' "Peek-a-Boo", which topped the charts for two weeks. In the chart's early years, the chart was closely associated with college rock, new wave, post-punk and electronic genres with a large presence of British, Irish and Australian artists, as only 24 of the chart's first 82 number-one hits were by American acts. Bands including Depeche Mode, Pixies, The Cure, New Order and R.E.M. were amongst the most popular acts on Alternative radio in the late 1980s and early 1990s. Many rock artists do not release commercial singles in the United States. Several popular songs which were not released as commercial singles did not qualify for the Hot 100 before December 1998, but performed very well on the Modern Rock Tracks chart.

In 1991, with the release of "Smells Like Teen Spirit" by Nirvana (which reached No. 1 on November 23, 1991), grunge became a new form of alternative rock to chart. However, grunge did not have a dominating presence on the chart in its heyday; over time, grunge would grow into popularity as a representation of alternative rock in the mainstream. Iconic grunge songs fared decently on the Alternative Songs chart but better on the Mainstream Rock Songs. For example, "Black" by Pearl Jam peaked only at No. 20 on the former but No. 3 on the latter. This was because the college rock and new wave of the 1980s remained the dominant styles of the format, while grunge became an alternative rock style that was popular on the Mainstream Rock format.

In the mid-1990s, alternative rock songs began to crossover to Pop radio, with acts such as Green Day, The Offspring and Alanis Morissette being played on Pop stations after establishing hits on the Alternative chart. Dominant genres included pop punk and softer alternative rock, as grunge acts such as Soundgarden and Stone Temple Pilots did not reach No. 1, while Britpop, a form of alternative rock from the UK, was represented only by Oasis. By the late 1990s, the Alternative Songs chart was ruled by relatively lighter alternative rock bands such as Third Eye Blind, Matchbox Twenty and Sugar Ray and a plethora of one-hit wonders.

At the turn of the century, alternative radio embraced nu-metal/rap rock with bands including Korn, Limp Bizkit and most famously, Linkin Park. Chris Molanphy of Pitchfork stated that "possibly the most loathed period for music of the last half-century, the rap-rock years—when looked through the prism of the Modern Rock chart's evolution—are a logical endpoint to a decade when alt-culture steadily de-wussified itself." Garage rock from the likes of The White Stripes and The Strokes also became hits in the early 2000s as a counter to the over-aggression of rap rock.

In the mid-2000s, the Alternative charts were ruled at the top by its most dominant members. From 2003 to 2008, the No. 1 song was by either Foo Fighters, Green Day, Incubus, Linkin Park or Red Hot Chili Peppers 49% of the time – 152 out of 313 weeks. During this time, 1990s alternative groups such as Nine Inch Nails and Weezer enjoyed their biggest success, while emo (Jimmy Eat World), indie rock (Modest Mouse) and pop punk (Fall Out Boy) also were popular. In 2007, "The Kill" by Thirty Seconds to Mars set a record for the longest-running hit in the history of the US alternative chart when it remained on the national chart for 52 weeks. Rise Against's "Savior" later broke the record by spending 65 weeks, followed around the same time by "1901" from Phoenix at 57. In 2009, Billboard renamed the chart to "Alternative Songs".

In the 2010s, the Alternative charts were led by softer indie pop and folk, and crossed over new acts to pop radio for the first time since the late 1990s, such as Foster the People, Imagine Dragons, Fun, and Gotye. The chart also began to diverge from the Mainstream Rock chart, as only 10 of 40 songs were shared between the two in November 2012, compared to 23 of 40 in November 2002. For the chart's 25th anniversary in 2013, Billboard published a list of the 100 biggest hits in the history of the Alternative chart. "Uprising" by Muse was listed at No. 1, having spent 17 weeks on the top of the chart and 53 weeks in total. "Savior" by Rise Against was listed at No. 2, peaking at #3 but staying on the chart for a record-breaking 65 weeks.

On October 11, 2018, Billboard released its Greatest of All Time Alternative Songs 30th-anniversary recap. The Foo Fighters continued its reign as the chart's No. 1 act over the list's first 30 years, after leading the 25th-anniversary recap. Muse's "Uprising" retained its standing as the all-time No. 1 song. Rise Against's " Savior" again ranked at No. 2, while Portugal. The Man's "Feel It Still" entered at No. 3, the highest debut on the 30th anniversary songs list, following its record 20-week reign in 2017. Six bands charted at least once in the first four decades of the chart's existence – Nine Inch Nails, Depeche Mode, Jane's Addiction, Red Hot Chili Peppers, U2 and Beastie Boys. As of 2023, only Depeche Mode and Red Hot Chili Peppers have extended that streak to five decades. Although the Alternative Songs chart "tends to be heavily male-dominated", Billboard released a list of the top-performing women in the chart's archives as part of the 30th anniversary of the Alternative Songs chart, with Dolores O'Riordan of the Cranberries taking the lead spot.
The current number one song is "Love from the Other Side" by Fall Out Boy.

Chart achievements

Artists with the most number-one songs 
Source: 
Red Hot Chili Peppers (15)
Green Day (12)
Linkin Park (12)
Twenty One Pilots (10)
Cage the Elephant (10)
Foo Fighters (10)

Acts who have reached number one in at least three decades

Four decades 
Source:
Green Day (1990s, 2000s, 2010s, 2020s)
Red Hot Chili Peppers (1990s, 2000s, 2010s, 2020s)
Blink-182 (1990s, 2000s, 2010s, 2020s)

Three decades 
Source:
Beck (1990s, 2000s, 2010s)
Coldplay (2000s, 2010s, 2020s)
Foo Fighters (1990s, 2000s, 2010s)
Linkin Park (2000s, 2010s, 2020s)
Modest Mouse (2000s, 2010s, 2020s)
U2 (1980s, 1990s, 2000s)
Weezer (2000s, 2010s, 2020s)

Artists with the most cumulative weeks at number one

Number-one debuts
"What's the Frequency, Kenneth?" by R.E.M. (1994)
"Dani California" by Red Hot Chili Peppers (2006)
"What I've Done" by Linkin Park (2007)

Artists with most chart entries

Songs with most weeks on the chart 
The following songs have charted for more than 52 weeks.

Songs with most weeks at number one
The songs with 16 or more weeks at number one.

Songs that have taken the longest time to reach number one

Albums with at least three number ones
Source:
5 songs
MeteoraLinkin Park ("Somewhere I Belong," "Faint," "Numb," "Lying from You," "Breaking the Habit," 2003–04)
3 songs
Scaled and Icy Twenty One Pilots ("Shy Away," "Saturday," "The Outside," 2021–22)
Social CuesCage the Elephant ("Ready to Let Go," "Social Cues," "Skin and Bones," 201921)
Trench Twenty One Pilots ("Jumpsuit," "Chlorine," "The Hype," 2018–19)
EvolveImagine Dragons ("Believer," "Thunder," "Whatever It Takes," 2017–18)
Only By the NightKings of Leon ("Sex on Fire," "Use Somebody," "Notion," 2008–09)
Echoes, Silence, Patience & GraceFoo Fighters ("The Pretender," "Long Road to Ruin," "Let It Die," 2007–08)
Stadium ArcadiumRed Hot Chili Peppers ("Dani California," "Tell Me Baby," "Snow ((Hey Oh))," 2006–07)
With TeethNine Inch Nails ("The Hand That Feeds," "Only," "Every Day Is Exactly the Same," 2005–06)
American IdiotGreen Day ("American Idiot," "Boulevard of Broken Dreams," "Holiday," 2004–05)
CalifornicationRed Hot Chili Peppers ("Scar Tissue," "Otherside," "Californication," 1999–2000)
Jagged Little PillAlanis Morissette ("You Oughta Know," "Hand in My Pocket," "Ironic," 1995–96)
DookieGreen Day ("Longview," "Basket Case," "When I Come Around," 1994–95)
Achtung BabyU2 ("The Fly," "Mysterious Ways," "One," 1991–92)

Top female performers (1988–2018) 
Source:

Other chart achievements

The Killers have had the longest time between number-ones (13 years and 6 months), with "When You Were Young" (2006) and "Caution" (2020).

 Fifteen songs released on an independent record label have reached number one on this chart: "Come Out and Play" by The Offspring, "What It's Like" by Everlast, "Panic Switch" by Silversun Pickups, "1901" by Phoenix, "Lay Me Down" by The Dirty Heads featuring Rome Ramirez, "Do I Wanna Know?" by Arctic Monkeys, "Hollow Moon (Bad Wolf)" by Awolnation, "The Sound of Winter" by Bush, "First" by Cold War Kids,"Bored to Death" by Blink-182, "Take It All Back" by Judah & the Lion, "No Roots" by Alice Merton, "Sober Up" by AJR featuring Rivers Cuomo, "Trampoline" by Shaed and "Running up that Hill" by Meg Myers.
Although Soundgarden's "Black Hole Sun" did not hit number one on the chart where it only peaked at number two on July 2, 1994, it actually became the Modern Rock Tracks year-end number one single of 1994, the only song to do so without ever being number one on the weekly chart.
In August 2013, Lorde became the first woman to top the chart since Tracy Bonham in 1996 when her song "Royals" reached number one in August 2013; the next woman to top the chart was Elle King with her song "Ex's & Oh's" which hit the top spot in September 2015. In September 2013, Lorde surpassed Alanis Morissette to become the woman with the longest-running single at number one when "Royals" spent its sixth week at number one. Since then, four other women have also topped the chart, Alice Merton (2018), Lana Del Rey (2019), Billie Eilish (2019), and Meg Myers (2020), as has female-led band Shaed (2019).
Lorde is the youngest solo artist to reach number one, achieving this feat at the age of 16 with "Royals".
Billie Eilish holds the records for most number ones on the chart for a soloist and most number ones for a female artist or band with female vocals, having topped the chart four times.
Fall Out Boy hold the record for the longest wait between their first entry and the first number one single on the chart, when "Love from the Other Side" reached the top in March 2023, 17 years and 9 months after they debuted on the chart with "Sugar, We're Goin Down" in June 2005.

See also
 List of Billboard number-one alternative hits

Notes

References

External links
 Current Alternative Airplay chart, Billboard.com.

Billboard charts
Alternative rock